The Kudlow Report was a news television program about business and politics hosted by Larry Kudlow, that aired on the CNBC television channel at 7pm ET until March 28, 2014.  The show began airing on January 26, 2009. It was a successor to Kudlow & Company, which aired from 2005 until October 2008. Kudlow & Company was a spinoff of the show Kudlow & Cramer which Kudlow co-hosted from 2002 to 2005. Kudlow & Cramer was called America Now from 2001 to 2002.

Transcripts of Kudlow's comments on the program are available on Kudlow's blog, Kudlow's Money Politic$.

On October 10, 2007, CNBC moved Kudlow & Company from the 5pm ET to the 7pm ET timeslot, being replaced by Fast Money.

During the show's opening, Kudlow recited the "Kudlow creed", summarizing the show's politico-economic inclination: "We believe that free market capitalism is the best path to prosperity!"

On March 7, 2014, CNBC announced that The Kudlow Report would end its run on the network at the end of March 2014. Kudlow then became a senior contributor on the network.

Segments 
 View from the Hill: Kudlow usually interviewed a prominent politician or politicians.
 Kudlow's Money Politic$ (same name as Kudlow's blog): Kudlow analyzed the relationship of Washington politics and the economy, especially the stock markets. The transcript of this segment was usually found on his blog.
 Money Makers: Kudlow interviewed a group of analysts, whom he usually introduced as, "[Our] money makers, our all-star know-it-alls. They're here to make you a bundle."  A frequent guest was Mike Holland, chairman of Holland and Co., based in Stamford, Connecticut.
 Econ-o-Rama: The guest was usually a well-known economist.

Notable guests 

The following prominent guests appeared on the show:

George W. Bush, President of the United States
Dick Cheney, Vice President of the United States
Barry Diller, Chairman and CEO of IAC/Interactive and Chairman of Expedia, Inc.
Chuck Hagel, U.S. Senator from Nebraska
Henry Kissinger, Former Secretary of State under Presidents Richard Nixon and Gerald Ford
Bill Richardson, Governor of New Mexico, Former Secretary of Energy
Charles Schumer, U.S. Senator from New York

The show also featured many recurring guests, including:

Robert Reich, Former Secretary of Labor under President Bill Clinton
Ana Marie Cox, the blogger of Wonkette
John Fund, The Wall Street Journal writer
Frank Gaffney, Washington Times writer
Elaine Garzarelli, technical analyst
Ann Coulter, conservative political columnist/author
Jagdish Bhagwati, Columbia University professor
Jeremy Siegel, finance professor at the Wharton School of the University of Pennsylvania
Ben Stein, Republican Party politician and former speechwriter under President Nixon
Peter Schiff, investment analyst
T. Boone Pickens, analyst of crude oil prices
Arthur Laffer, creator of the Laffer Curve
Roger G. Ibbotson, Yale School of Management professor

See also 
 Kudlow & Cramer
 America Now

References

External links

CNBC original programming
CNBC Asia original programming
2005 American television series debuts
2008 American television series endings
2009 American television series debuts
2014 American television series endings
2000s American television news shows
2000s American television talk shows
Business-related television series
Conservative media in the United States